Valentine Yanovna Zhubinskaya (17 May 1926 – 2013) was born in Kharkiv, Ukraine. She was a Ukrainian composer, concertmistress, lecturer, and pianist. Zhubinskaya was the concertmistress at Kharkiv State Theatre until 1948, while studying piano under M. Pilstrom and composition under V. Barabashov at the Kharkiv Conservatory.  She graduated with distinction in 1949 and did postgraduate studies in Moscow, becoming a lecturer on the piano at Gnessin State Musical College in 1961.

Compositions
Her compositions include:

Chamber 
Romance and Serenade (violin and piano; 1946)

Orchestra 
Piano Concerto (1950)

Piano 
Children's Album (12 pieces; 1946)
Collection of Children's Pieces (1960)
Eight Pieces (1960)
Fifteen Pieces (1969)
Four Etudes (1946)
Lullaby and Humoresque (1946)
Romance
Russian Variations (1963)
Sonata (1948)
Song and Waltz (1946)
Three Improvisations (1963)
Waltz (1948)

Vocal 
Children's Songs (1971)
Cycle of Works by Bulgarian Poets (1962)
Dobruy Khleb Cycle (chorus; 1972)
Molodezhnaya (Malykhin; voice and piano; 1968)
Pesnya o Taimyre (M. Arons; voice and piano; 1947)
Razvernis Garmonika (A. Prokofiev; voice and piano; 1947)
Two Ukrainian Folk Songs (a capella chorus; 1948)
Vremena Goda Cycle for Children (voice and piano; 1959)

References

1926 births
2013 deaths
Women composers
Ukrainian composers
Concertmasters
Ukrainian women pianists
Musicians from Kharkiv